Otto Karl Robert Wernicke (30 September 1893, Osterode am Harz – 7 November 1965) was a German actor. He is best known for his role as police inspector Karl Lohmann in the two Fritz Lang films M and The Testament of Dr. Mabuse.

Married to a Jewish woman, he was only able to continue working in Germany after the Nazi Party took power in 1933 because he received a special dispensation from the Reich Chamber of Culture. In 1943, he portrayed Captain Smith in Titanic, the first film on the subject which was simply titled Titanic, and the first to combine various fictional characters and subplots with the true events of the sinking; both conventions went on to become a staple of Titanic films. After being cast in 1944 in the propaganda epic Kolberg, he was added to the Gottbegnadeten-Liste, a list of artists considered crucial to Nazi culture which Joseph Goebbels compiled for Adolf Hitler's approval.

Selected filmography

 Girls You Don't Marry (1923)
 Wo Menschen Frieden finden (1923)
 The Searching Soul (1925)
 Mrs Worrington's Perfume (1925) - Philipp Worrington
 The Gambling Den of Montmartre (1928) - Der Apache
 M (1931) - Inspector Karl Lohmann
 Storms of Passion (1932) - Police Commissioner
 Nacht der Versuchung (1932)
 Peter Voss, Thief of Millions (1932) - Pitt
 The Bartered Bride (1932) - Kezal - Heiratsvermittler
 The Naked Truth (1932) - Karl, Lokomotivführer
 The Testament of Dr. Mabuse (1933) - Inspector Karl Lohmann
 Die blonde Christl (1933) - Franz Lechner
 S.A.-Mann Brand (1933) - Herr Brand
 The Tunnel (1933) - Bärmann
 The Fugitive from Chicago (1934) - Wolke, Werkmeister
 Achtung! Wer kennt diese Frau? (1934) - Thomas Burger
 The Switched Bride (1934) - Der Gefängnisdirektor
 Master of the World (1934) - Wolter, Oberingenieur
 Stupid Mama (1934) - Inspektor Beneke
 Between Heaven and Earth (1934) - Motz, Schieferbruchbesitzer
 Peer Gynt (1934) - Parker
 Knockout (1935) - P. F. Schmidtchen
 Ein ganzer Kerl (1935) - Eckhardt, Wiegemeister
 The Valiant Navigator (1935) - Bäckermeister Holm
 Hangmen, Women and Soldiers (1935) - Pieter Timm
 Die lustigen Weiber (1936) - Herr Fluth / Frank Ford
 Arzt aus Leidenschaft (1936) - Geheimrat Grimm, Chefarzt der Klinik
 Street Music (1936) - Godemann - Gastwirt
 The Castle in Flanders (1936) - Bonnet - Agent
 Uncle Bräsig (1936) - Onkel Bräsig
 Dangerous Crossing (1937) - Scheffler - Aufsichtsbeamter
 Wie der Hase läuft (1937) - Warnecke - Ortsvorsteher in Pümpelhausen
 Heimweh (1937) - Stober, Pastor
 Unternehmen Michael (1937) - Der Artillerie-Kommandeur
 Manege (1937) - Jan Morell
 Autobus S (1937) - 'Kapitän' Kröker
 Der Katzensteg (1937) - Gastwirt Merckel
 Starke Herzen (1937) - Ludwig
 Das große Abenteuer (1938) - Kriminalrat
 Stimme des Blutes (1938)
 Rätsel um Beate (1938) - Vater Hübner - Schmied
 Wie einst im Mai (1938) - Schradecke, Stellmacher
 Eine Frau kommt in die Tropen (1938) - Verwalter Miller
 Secret Code LB 17 (1938) - Police Commissar Borel
 Nordlicht (1938) - Kaufmann Hansen
 Love Letters from Engadin (1938) - Thomas Viertinger, Hotelier
 Dreizehn Mann und eine Kanone (1938)
 Three Wonderful Days (1939)
 Silvesternacht am Alexanderplatz (1939) - Gast im 'Elite'
 Gold in New Frisco (1939) - Jonathan Pepper
 D III 88 (1939) - Oberwerkmeister Bonicke
 Midsummer Night's Fire (1939) - Vogelreuter
 Der Stammbaum des Dr. Pistorius (1939) - Franz
 Maria Ilona (1939) - Fürst Windischgrätz
 Was wird hier gespielt? (1940)
 Ohm Krüger (1941)  - British concentration camp commander
 Friedemann Bach (1941) - Kunde im Musikladen (uncredited)
 Heimkehr (1941) - Old Manz
 Die Kellnerin Anna (1941) - Ludwig Burgstaller
 Sein Sohn (1942) - Vater Brugg, Geschäftsführer bei Hellmers
 The Great King (1942) - Oberst Rochow
 Der Seniorchef (1942) - Georg von Schulte, Pferdezüchter
 Titanic (1943) - Captain Edward J. Smith
 Der große Preis (1944) - Obermeister Kramp
 Seinerzeit zu meiner Zeit (1944) - Amtgerichtsrat Witt
 Das Leben ruft (1944) - Der Vater
 Kolberg (1945) - Bauer Werner
 Kamerad Hedwig (1945) - Fritz Beier
 Der Fall Molander (1945) - Kunsthändler
 Between Yesterday and Tomorrow (1947) - Ministerialdirektor Trunk
 Der Herr vom andern Stern (1948) - General
 Long Is the Road (1949) - Senior Doctor
 Amico (1949) - Robert Kornagel, Konditormeister
 Du bist nicht allein (1949) - Martin Jürgens
 Who Drove the Grey Ford? (1950) - Kriminalkommissar Thieme
 Chased by the Devil (1950) - Herr Dakar
 Die fidele Tankstelle (1950) - Gustav Krause
 Love and Blood (1951)
 Shadows Over Naples (1951) - Pietro
 Sky Without Stars (1955) - Inspektor Hoffmann
  (1956) - Dr. Rainer sr.
 The Captain from Köpenick (1956) - Schuhmachermeister
 Das Sonntagskind (1956) - Willowitz
 The Scarlet Baroness (1959)
  (1959) - Hausmeister
 Immer die Mädchen (1959) - Diener Adam Fröschl

References

External links
 
 Photographs of Otto Wernicke

1893 births
1965 deaths
People from Osterode am Harz
German male film actors
German male silent film actors
People from the Province of Hanover
20th-century German male actors